Konets Gor is a rural locality (a village) in Dobryansky District, Perm Krai, Russia. The population was 2 as of 2010. There are 12 streets.

Geography 
Konets Gor is located 46 km south of Dobryanka (the district's administrative centre) by road. Adishchevo is the nearest rural locality.

References 

Rural localities in Dobryansky District